Beijing Language and Culture University (BLCU), colloquially known in Chinese as Yuyan Xueyuan, has the main aim of teaching the Chinese language and culture to foreign students. However, it also takes Chinese students specializing in foreign languages and other relevant subjects of humanities and social sciences, and trains teachers of Chinese as a foreign language. It used to be the only institute of this kind in China. After the push for massification of higher education starting in the 90s, nowadays many other universities in almost every major city in China have a similar offer. Thus bachelor, master or post-doc degrees in "Teaching Chinese as a second language to Foreigners", as well as bachelor's and master's degrees in several foreign languages, are no longer only to be found at BLCU. 

Beijing Language and Culture University is often called "Little United Nations" in China because of its very large number of international students from various countries. As of 2022, there are approximately 9,000 international students in its campus, ranking first in China.

As of 2020, Beijing Language and Culture University ranked no.5 nationwide among universities specialized on languages teaching and research in the recent edition of a recognized Best Chinese Universities Ranking, the sub-ranking of Shanghai Ranking.

History
Early in the 1950s when the teaching of Chinese as a foreign language (TCFL) was still at the initial stage, the first generation of BLCU teachers took an active part in the pioneering work. As a result, the first school of higher education specially oriented to foreign students, "Higher Preparatory School for Foreign Students", was established in June 1962. In 1964, the school was officially named "Beijing Language Institute". In June 1996, it was renamed "Beijing Language and Culture University". Its Chinese name was shortened in July 2002 to "Beijing Language University" with the approval of the Ministry of Education, but the English name remained unchanged. September 6, 2002, witnessed the celebration of the 40th anniversary of BLCU, for which General-Secretary Jiang Zemin and Vice-Premier Li Lanqing wrote letters of congratulations, and the Chairman of the NPC Standing Committee Li Peng wrote words of encouragement. BLCU was granted the privilege to confer doctoral degrees in foreign languages and literature in 2011.

Throughout its history, the university has educated more than 220,000 international students from 189 different nations and regions around the globe. As of 2022, there are approximately 9,000 international students in its campus, ranking first in China.

Campus

The campus of BLCU is located in the Haidian District of Beijing. It takes about 330,289 m2, and total building area is about 427,342 m2. Most teaching facilities, including the main building, library and gym are in the teaching area, while dormitories for Chinese students are there as well. The special dormitory for foreign students is Building 17, located in the living area with apartments for staff and families. Some grocery stores can be found in both the teaching and living areas, and the biggest market zone Wudaokou (五道口) is near the north exit of the living area.

Bachelor's degree programs
Chinese Language and Literature
Teaching Chinese as a Second Language
English Language and Literature
French Language and Literature
German Language and Literature
Spanish Language and Literature
Russian Language and Literature
Arabic Language and Literature
Japanese Language and Literature
Korean Language and Literature
Italian Language and Literature
Portuguese Language and Literature
Turkish Language and Literature
Translation and Interpretation
Computer Science and Technology
Information Management and Information Systems
Technology of Digital Media
Finance
Accounting
Painting
Journalism
International Politics
International Economics and Trade

Master's degree programs
Chinese Linguistics and Philology
Linguistics and Applied Linguistics
Course Design and Teaching Theories
Special Historical Studies
Chinese Ancient Literature
International Politics
Foreign Linguistics and Applied Linguistics
Comparative Literature and World Literature
Contemporary Chinese Literature
Literary Theory
Ancient Chinese Philology
English Language and Literature
French Language and Literature
Japanese Language and Literature
Spanish Language and Literature
Arabic Language and Literature
European Languages and Literatures
Asian and African Languages and Literatures
Ideological and Political Education
Basic Psychology
Chinese Ethnic Languages and Literatures
Master's program of Teaching Chinese to Speakers of Other Languages (MTCSOL)
Technology of Computer Application
Master of Translation and Interpreting

Doctoral degree programs
Arabic Language and Literature
Linguistics and Applied Linguistics
Comparative Literature and World Literature
Chinese Ancient Literature
English Language and Literature
Theory of Literature and Art
Chinese Philology
Studies of Ancient Chinese Documents
Modern and Contemporary Chinese Literature
Chinese Ethnic Languages and Literatures

Notable faculty
 Wei-Heng Chen
 Liang Xiaosheng, novelist and screenwriter
 Huang Jing, Chinese-American political scientist and alleged spy
 Valerie Grosvenor Myer, English novelist, biographer and literary historian

Notable alumni
 Da Chen, author
 Hong Lei, diplomat
 Kassym-Jomart Tokayev, President of Kazakhstan and Former Director-General of the United Nations Office at Geneva
 Karim Massimov, Prime Minister of Kazakhstan (10 January 2007 - 24 September 2012 and 2 April 2014 - 8 September 2016)
 Mulatu Teshome, President of the Federal Democratic Republic of Ethiopia (7 October 2013 - 25 October 2018)
 Awkwafina, Actress and rapper

See also 
 Beijing Language and Culture University Press
 Japan Campus of Foreign Universities

References

External links
Beijing Language and Culture University

 
Language schools in China
Schools of Chinese as a second or foreign language
Academic language institutions
Educational institutions established in 1962
1962 establishments in China
Universities and colleges in Haidian District